Zoran Stjepanović (born June 13, 1975) is a Serbian former football midfielder.

During his career he played for Serbian clubs Budućnost Valjevo and Spartak Subotica before moving to Cyprus to play with Alki Larnaca, Omonia and Ethnikos Achnas.

External links

1975 births
Living people
Footballers from Belgrade
Serbian footballers
Serbian expatriate footballers
Cypriot First Division players
FK Budućnost Valjevo players
FK Spartak Subotica players
AC Omonia players
Alki Larnaca FC players
Ethnikos Achna FC players
Association football midfielders
Expatriate footballers in Cyprus